Arvid Håkan Herbert Carlsson "Fågeln" Wallman (3 February 1901 – 25 October 1982) was a Swedish diver. He competed in the plain high diving event at the 1920 and 1924 Summer Olympics and finished in first and eighth place, respectively. After graduating in 1923 from the Chalmers University of Technology he worked as a civil engineer. His granddaughter Susanne Wetteskog also became an Olympic diver.

References

1901 births
1982 deaths
Swedish male divers
Olympic divers of Sweden
Divers at the 1920 Summer Olympics
Divers at the 1924 Summer Olympics
Olympic gold medalists for Sweden
Olympic medalists in diving
Medalists at the 1920 Summer Olympics
Divers from Gothenburg
20th-century Swedish people